Elaine is a town in Victoria, Australia, located on the Midland Highway between Ballarat and Geelong.

The railway came through the town in 1862, with the opening of the Geelong-Ballarat line, but Elaine railway station was only opened ten years later, and was not provided with the grand bluestone buildings provided at the original stations on the line. Today, only freight trains use the line.

The Post Office opened on 1 March 1859 as Mount Doran, and was renamed Elaine in 1872. Elaine Railway Station Post Office, some distance away, opened eleven days after the station, on 14 April 1873. In 1877, the latter office was renamed Elaine, and Elaine reverted to the earlier name of Mount Doran.

Elaine is home to a Serbian Orthodox monastery with five monks and two nuns.

References

External links
 "Elaine, the little town that could" by Neelima Choahan

Towns in Victoria (Australia)